The term Judeo-Christian is used to group Christianity and Judaism together, either in reference to Christianity's derivation from Judaism, Christianity's borrowing of Jewish scripture to constitute the "Old Testament" of the Christian Bible, or due to the parallels or commonalities in Judaeo-Christian ethics shared by the two religions. The term "Judæo Christian" first appeared in the 19th century as a word for Jewish converts to Christianity. 

In the United States, the term was widely used during the Cold War in an attempt to suggest that the United States had a unified American identity which was opposed to communism. Theologian and author Arthur A. Cohen, in The Myth of the Judeo-Christian Tradition, questioned the theological validity of the Judeo-Christian concept, instead, he suggested that it was essentially an invention of American politics.

The use of the term Abrahamic religions to refer to the common grouping of faiths which are attributed to Abraham (the Baháʼí Faith, Islam, Samaritanism, Druzism, and other faiths in addition to Judaism and Christianity) is also sometimes seen as problematic.

History
The term "Judæo Christian" first appears in a letter by Alexander McCaul which is dated October 17, 1821. The term in this case referred to Jewish converts to Christianity. The term was similarly used by Joseph Wolff in 1829, in reference to a type of church that would observe some Jewish traditions in order to convert Jews. Mark Silk states in the early 19th century the term was "most widely used (in French as well as English) to refer to the early followers of Jesus who opposed" the wishes of Paul the Apostle and wanted "to restrict the message of Jesus to Jews and who insisted on maintaining Jewish law and ritual".

Friedrich Nietzsche used the German term  ("Jewish-Christian") to describe and emphasize what he believed were neglected aspects of the continuity which exists between the Jewish and Christian worldviews. The expression appears in The Antichrist, published in 1895 but written several years earlier; a fuller development of Nietzsche's argument can be found in a prior work, On the Genealogy of Morality.

The concept of Judeo-Christian ethics or Judeo-Christian values in an ethical (rather than a theological or liturgical) sense was used by George Orwell in 1939, along with the phrase "the Judaeo-Christian scheme of morals". Theologian Richard L. Rubenstein wrote that the "normative Judaeo-Christian interpretation of history" is to treat human suffering, such as a plague, as punishment for human guilt.

Historian K. Healan Gaston has stated that the term emerged as a descriptor of the United States in the 1930s, when the US sought to forge a unified cultural identity in an attempt to distinguish itself from the fascism and communism in Europe. The term rose to greater prominence during the Cold War, especially when it was used to express opposition to communist atheism. In the 1970s, the term became particularly associated with the American Christian right, and it is often employed in political attempts to restrict immigration and LGBT rights.

The Jewish concept of atonement is a major aspect of Christian theology, i.e. atonement through the crucifixion of Jesus Christ. Circumcision is a Jewish tradition kept by some modern evangelical Christians, despite its rejection by Paul in the New Testament.

Inter-group relations

In the United States
The rise of antisemitism in the 1930s led concerned Protestants, Catholics, and Jews to take steps to increase mutual understanding and lessen the level of antisemitism in the United States. In this effort, precursors of the National Conference of Christians and Jews created teams consisting of a priest, a rabbi, and a minister, to run programs across the country, and fashion a more pluralistic America, no longer defined as a Christian land, but "one nurtured by three ennobling traditions: Protestantism, Catholicism and Judaism....The phrase 'Judeo-Christian' entered the contemporary lexicon as the standard liberal term for the idea that Western values rest on a religious consensus that included Jews."

In the aftermath of World War 2 and the Holocaust, "there was a revolution in Christian theology in America. […] The greatest shift in Christian attitudes towards the Jewish people since Constantine converted the Roman Empire." The rise of Christian Zionism, religiously motivated Christian interest, and support for the state of Israel increased interest in Judaism among American evangelicals. This interest is especially focused on areas of commonality between the teachings of Judaism and their own beliefs. 

During the late 1940s, evangelical proponents of the new Judeo-Christian approach lobbied Washington for diplomatic support of the new state of Israel.  From the 1990s, continuing through the first two decades of the 21st century, interest in and a positive attitude towards America's Judeo-Christian tradition has become mainstream among evangelicals and (to some extent) the political conservative movement in the United States. 

In contrast, by the 1970s, mainline Protestant denominations and the National Council of Churches were more supportive of Palestinians than Israel. Natan Sharansky observed in 2019, that for the first time, he was encountering the situation of nations with ample governmental support for Israel but disinterest and even overt hostility by the Jewish populace.

The scriptural basis for this new positive attitude towards Jews among evangelicals is found in Genesis 12:3, in which God promises that he will bless those who bless Abraham and his descendants, and curse those who curse them. Other factors in the new philo-Semitism include gratitude to the Jews for contributing to the theological foundations of Christianity and being the source of the prophets and Jesus; remorse for the Church's history of antisemitism; and fear that God will judge the nations at the end of time on the basis of how they treated the Jewish people. Moreover, for many evangelicals Israel is seen as the instrument through which prophecies of the end times are fulfilled.

In Europe
See philosemitism.

Jewish responses
The Jewish community's attitude towards the concept has been mixed. In the 1930s, "In the face of worldwide anti-semitic efforts to stigmatize and destroy Judaism, influential Christians and Jews in America labored to uphold it, pushing Judaism from the margins of American religious life towards its very center." During World War II, Jewish chaplains worked with Catholic priests and Protestant ministers in order to promote goodwill, addressing servicemen who, "in many cases had never seen, much less heard a Rabbi speak before." At funerals for the unknown soldier, rabbis stood alongside the other chaplains and recited prayers in Hebrew. A 1948 postage stamp commemorated their heroism with the words: "interfaith in action."

In the 1950s, "a spiritual and cultural revival washed over American Jewry" in response to the trauma of the Holocaust.  American Jews became more confident in their desire to be identified as different.

Two notable books addressed the relationship between contemporary Judaism and Christianity, Abba Hillel Silver's Where Judaism Differs and Leo Baeck's Judaism and Christianity, both motivated by an impulse to clarify Judaism's distinctiveness "in a world where the term Judeo-Christian had obscured critical differences between the two faiths." Reacting against the blurring of theological distinctions, Rabbi Eliezer Berkovits wrote that "Judaism is Judaism because it rejects Christianity, and Christianity is Christianity because it rejects Judaism." Theologian and author Arthur A. Cohen, in The Myth of the Judeo-Christian Tradition, questioned the theological validity of the Judeo-Christian concept and suggested that it was essentially an invention of American politics, while Jacob Neusner, in Jews and Christians: The Myth of a Common Tradition, writes, "The two faiths stand for different people talking about different things to different people."

Law professor Stephen M. Feldman looking at the period before 1950, chiefly in Europe, sees invocation of a "Judeo-Christian tradition" as supersessionism:

See also
 Mandaeans
 Messianic Judaism

Notes

References

Further reading
 Bobrick, Benson. Wide as the Waters : The Story of the English Bible and the Revolution It Inspired. Simon & Schuster 2001. 
 Paula Fredriksen. From Jesus to Christ: The Origins of the New Testament Images of Christ, Yale University Press, 
 Hexter, J. H. The Judaeo-Christian Tradition (Second Edition). Yale University Press, 1995; 
 McGrath, Alister. In the Beginning: The Story of the King James Bible and How It Changed a Nation, a Language, and a Culture. Anchor Books, 2002. .

External links
 What does Judeo-Christian mean?, Dennis Prager (30 March 2004)

 
Christian terminology
Christianity and Judaism related controversies
Supersessionism
Western culture